Donna Burke is an Australian voice actress, singer, narrator and businesswoman. She is also known for her vocal work on songs produced for video game series such as Metal Gear and Final Fantasy.

Biography
Burke graduated from Edith Cowan University. Her education included "operatic voice, speech and drama" and she received classical voice training for ten years.

From 1989 to 1995, Burke taught Media, English and Religious Education to senior students at Chisholm Catholic College. She moved to Japan in 1996 and initially worked as a teacher of English before obtaining some recording work.

Burke married Bill Benfield, a British former teacher. In 2004, Burke and Benfield started a record label, Dagmusic, which catered for foreign artists. Burke released her debut album, Lost and Found, through Dagmusic.

Burke has worked as a freelance announcer at NHK since 1999. She is also the lyricist for numerous Japanese TV commercials, anime songs and J-pop group tunes.

Burke created Hotteeze in 2004, a company she created to export Japanese heat pads worldwide.

Voice work
Burke's voice has been used in Japan since 2005 for announcements on the Tokaido, Sanyo, and Kyushu Shinkansen bullet train system. Her voice is also used in Narita Airport Delta lounges and in English language guidance for the Emperor Showa Memorial Museum.

In 2007, Burke narrated a documentary titled Climate in Crisis - Part 1, which won the 2007 silver medal for Environment/Ecology at the New York Television Festival and the 2007 Earth Vision Award at the Tokyo Global Environmental Film Festival.

Filmography

Anime

Video games

Solo discography
 Lost and Found (with Bill Benfield) (2000)
 Éirí na Gréine (2001)
 Donna Burke with the David Silverman Quartet (2002)
 Goodbye Nakamura EP (2004)
 Blue Nights (1 June 2005)

Other discography
 The Yamaha Educational Children's Songs CDs - Various Artists (1997–2003 - vocals for several tracks)
 Automne - Various Artists (1998 - vocals for "Love Theme from Romeo and Juliet," vocals and lyrics for other tracks)
 Para Para Panic CDs - Volumes 2, 3, 4, 5, 6 & 7 / Various Artists (2000 - vocals for several tracks)
 Elebits - "The Smile of You" (2006 - in collaboration with Naoyuki Satō)
 ABBA Ibiza Caliente Mix - ABBA, Sabu (2001 - vocals for several tracks)
 The Bleep Brothers (2001 - vocals for three tracks)
 Vandread: Original OVA Soundtrack 1 - Yasunori Iwasaki, Various Artists (2001 - vocal for "What a Wonderful World")
 Vandread: Original OVA Soundtrack 2 - Yasunori Iwasaki, Various Artists (2001 - vocal and lyrics for "Somedays")
 Strange Dawn - "To The Sky" (2002)
 Turn A Gundam: Original Movie Soundtrack - "Wakusei no Gogo, Bokura wa Kisu wo Shita" - Yoko Kanno (2002 - vocal for "After All")
 "Seven" - V6 (2002 - lyrics for "One")
 Final Fantasy Crystal Chronicles - "Morning Sky" and "Moonless Starry Night"
 Haibane Renmei: Original OVA Soundtrack 1 - "Hanenone (ハネノネ)" - Kow Otani, Masumi Sakaue (2003 - vocal and lyrics for "Wondering")
 Honda Legend 2004 television commercial campaign - "The Phantom of the Opera" (with Dennis Gunn)
 JR Central 2006 television commercial campaign - "Again" (with Nello Angelucci, based on the Polovtsian Dances)
 Dance Dance Revolution SuperNova - "Star Gate Heaven" and "Star Gate Heaven (FUTURE LOVE Mix)" - Various Artists (2006 - in collaboration with Sōta Fujimori)
 Tokimeki Memorial 2 Substories: Dancing Summer Vacation - "Hero ~Dancing Summer Mix English Ver.~"
 OutRun 2 - "Life Was a Bore"
 The Last Remnant - "Journey's End"
 Final Fantasy Crystal Chronicles: The Crystal Bearers - "Kuule tää unelmain" and "Ephemeron"
 God Eater - "God and Man"
 Tales of Legendia - "Hotarubi" and "My Tales" with Gab Desmond
 Metal Gear Solid: Peace Walker - "Heavens Divide"
 Metal Gear Solid V: The Phantom Pain - "Sins of the Father"
 Metal Gear Solid Vocal Tracks (2015 - vocals for several tracks)
 Tokyo Ghoul √A - "Glassy Sky"
 Implosion - Never Lose Hope - "Way in the Dark"
 Girls' Frontline - "A Moment of My Nightmare"

Lyricist
 Final Fantasy 15 XP - "Choosing Hope" (2017)
 Implosion - "Way in the Dark" (2015)
 Resident Evil - "At the End of a Long Escape" (2013)
 Square Enix DISSIDIA012 - "Final Fantasy" (2011)
 The Last Ranker - "Born to Survive" (2010)
 Bandai Games - "God Eater" (2010)
 NHK Little Charo 2 - "Sayonara" (2010)
 Capcom - "Bio Hazard Dark Side Chronicles" (Sleeping Beauty) (2009)
 Capcom - "Last Ranker" (2009)
 Bandai Namco Games God Eater - "God and Man" (2009)
 Square Enix Last Remnant - "Journey’s End" (2008)
 Square Enix Final Fantasy Crystal Chronicles - "Moonless Starry Night", "Morning Sky" (2003)
 Haibanae Renmei - "Wondering" (2007)
 Konami Elebits - "The Smile Of You" (2006)
 Konami - "Star Gate Heaven" (2004)

References

External links
 
 
 

Living people
Actresses from Perth, Western Australia
Australian expatriates in Japan
Australian women pop singers
Australian jazz singers
Australian podcasters
Australian video game actresses
Australian voice actresses
21st-century Australian businesswomen
21st-century Australian businesspeople
Musicians from Perth, Western Australia
Video game musicians
Year of birth missing (living people)
20th-century Australian actresses
21st-century Australian actresses
20th-century Australian women singers
21st-century Australian women singers